Alison Jayne Merrien  (born 28 November 1974) is an indoor bowls player from Saint Peter Port, Guernsey.

Bowls career

Indoors
Merrien won double gold in the women's singles defeating Karen Murphy and the mixed pairs with Simon Skelton the 2011 World Indoor Bowls Championship. She won a third medal eight years later in 2019 losing out to Julie Forrest of Scotland in the final. In 2022, she finally claimed a third title when winning the mixed pairs with Paul Foster and also reached the women's singles final. She also reached the mixed pairs final in 2023.

In the southern hemisphere equivalent the World Cup Singles she has won two titles in 2008 and 2012 and has finished runner up on three more occasions. In 2022, Merrien won the mixed pairs at the inaugural World Bowls Indoor Championships, partnering Stewart Anderson, they defeated Michael Stepney and Claire Anderson in the final.

In addition she has claimed three IIBC singles titles in 2009, 2011 & 2015 and the mixed pairs Championship in 2001 and 2004.

Nationally she has won the British Isles Indoor Women's Singles Championship in 2002, 2006, 2008, 2009, 2012 and 2015 and the British Isles Indoor Women's Pairs Championship in 2015

Outdoors
By virtue of winning her national title she qualified to represent Guernsey at the World Singles Champion of Champions in 2007 where she defeated Siti Zalina Ahmad in the final to win the gold medal.

Awards
Merrien was appointed a Member of the Order of the British Empire (MBE) for services to bowls in the 2012 New Year Honours, and is married to Ian Merrien who is also a successful bowls player.

References

Living people
Guernsey female bowls players
1974 births
Members of the Order of the British Empire
Indoor Bowls World Champions
People from Saint Peter Port